Deni Jurić (born 3 September 1997) is a Croatian-Australian professional footballer who plays as a forward for Prva HNL club Rijeka  on loan from Dinamo Zagreb. He is the younger brother of Australian international Tomi Jurić.

Club career
Although born in Australia, Deni grew up playing his early career in Croatia, partly due to his Croatian origin, which began with the Sesvete club. He later joined the youth team of Hajduk Split for a season as well as playing in Slovenia for Triglav Kranj. He later wandered through Croatian clubs in the second division, Solin and Rudeš before moving to top-flight once more, joining for Šibenik where he played alongside another fellow Croatian Australian Doni Grdić.

Dinamo Zagreb
In 2021, he was signed by Dinamo Zagreb, making him the first-ever Australian soccer player since Mark Viduka, also another famous Croatian Australian, to play for the club. He was also loaned to his former club Šibenik, representing the team in only four matches.

International career
Deni had played for both Croatian and Australian youth levels, as he carries the nationalities of both countries. In 2021, he has expressed interest in representing Croatia, although he remains open to the potential opportunity to represent Australia; he is also available to represent Bosnia and Herzegovina due to his parents are Bosnian Croats.

Career statistics

Club

Notes

References

1997 births
Living people
Soccer players from Sydney
Australian people of Croatian descent
Australian people of Bosnia and Herzegovina descent
Association football forwards
Australian soccer players
Australia youth international soccer players
Croatian footballers
Croatia youth international footballers
NK Croatia Sesvete players
NK Sesvete players
HNK Hajduk Split II players
NK Solin players
NK Triglav Kranj players
NK Rudeš players
HNK Šibenik players
GNK Dinamo Zagreb players
HNK Gorica players
HNK Rijeka players
First Football League (Croatia) players
Slovenian PrvaLiga players
Croatian Football League players
Australian expatriate soccer players
Croatian expatriate footballers
Croatian expatriate sportspeople in Slovenia
Expatriate footballers in Slovenia